"Krusty Gets Busted" is the twelfth and penultimate episode of the first season of the American animated television series The Simpsons. It originally aired on the Fox Network in the United States on April 29, 1990. The episode was written by Jay Kogen and Wallace Wolodarsky, and directed by Brad Bird. In the episode, Krusty the Clown is convicted of armed robbery of the Kwik-E-Mart and imprisoned. Convinced that Krusty has been framed, Bart and Lisa investigate the crime and learn that Krusty's sidekick, Sideshow Bob, is the culprit.

This episode marks the first full-fledged appearance of Kent Brockman, and Kelsey Grammer makes his first guest appearance on the show as the voice of Sideshow Bob.

Plot
Patty and Selma visit the Simpson family to show them slides of their last trip to Yucatán. Homer is asked by Marge to stop by the Kwik-E-Mart on the way home from work to buy some ice cream. In the store, he sees a figure resembling Krusty the Clown committing a robbery. The police soon apprehend Krusty and take him into custody. After Homer identifies him at a police lineup and in the courtroom, Krusty is incarcerated, upsetting Bart. Reverend Lovejoy urges the town's residents to destroy Krusty's merchandise. Krusty's sidekick Sideshow Bob becomes the new host of his show, now called The Side-Show Bob Cavalcade of Whimsy and retooled to focus on education and classic literature while retaining The Itchy & Scratchy Show. Refusing to accept that his idol could have committed the crime, Bart enlists Lisa's help to prove Krusty's innocence.

At the crime scene, Bart and Lisa recall the robber read a magazine and used a microwave oven; Krusty is illiterate and has an artificial pacemaker which requires him to avoid microwave radiation. When Bart and Lisa visit Sideshow Bob to learn whether Krusty had any enemies, he gives them tickets to his show. During the live broadcast, Bart is invited on stage with Bob, who dismisses Bart's points about the microwave and magazine.

When Bob says he has "big shoes to fill", Bart remembers when Homer stepped on the robber's foot during his robbery. Despite wearing large clown shoes, Krusty has small feet and would not have felt Homer stepping on them. Bart deduces that Sideshow Bob is the culprit, since he had the most to gain from Krusty's downfall. He proves Bob is the culprit by hitting one of Bob's feet with a mallet and reveals their size as Bob reacts in pain. While watching the show, the police realize they failed to notice this piece of evidence and head to the studio to arrest Bob. Once he is, Bob confesses about why he framed Krusty: he hated being on the receiving end of Krusty's humiliating gags. Now released after his exoneration, Krusty regains the trust of the townspeople, including Homer, who apologizes for misidentifying him, as he thanks Bart for his help. Bart hangs a picture of himself shaking hands with Krusty in his bedroom, which is refilled with Krusty decor and merchandise.

Production

Director Brad Bird wanted to open the episode with a close-up of Krusty's face. The staff liked the idea, and he then suggested that all three acts of the episode, defined by the placement of the commercial breaks, should begin with a close-up shot. Act one begins with Krusty's face introducing the audience at his show, act two begins with Krusty's face being locked up behind bars, and act three begins with Sideshow Bob's face on a big poster. Krusty's character is based on a television clown from Portland, Oregon called Rusty Nails, whom The Simpsons creator Matt Groening watched while growing up in Portland. The original teleplay, written by Jay Kogen and Wallace Wolodarsky, was 78 pages long and many scenes had to be cut. One scene that had to be cut down was the scene where Patty and Selma show the slideshow of their vacation; it originally contained images of them being detained for bringing heroin into America.

"Krusty Gets Busted" is Sideshow Bob's second appearance on The Simpsons but is his first major appearance. He first appeared as a minor character in the season one episode "The Telltale Head". In that appearance, his design was simpler and his hair was round. However, near the end of the episode, he appears with his more familiar hairstyle. Bob's design was updated for "Krusty Gets Busted", and the animators tried to redo his scenes in "The Telltale Head" with the re-design, but did not have enough time. The script for "Krusty Gets Busted" called for James Earl Jones to voice Bob, but the producers instead went with Kelsey Grammer, a cast member on Cheers at the time. Kent Brockman, Judge Snyder, and Scott Christian make their first appearances on The Simpsons in this episode.

Cultural references

Chief Wiggum's order during the suspect line-up to "send in the clowns" is an allusion to the Stephen Sondheim song "Send in the Clowns" from the 1973 musical A Little Night Music. The Sondheim musical took its name from Mozart's Serenade No. 13 for strings in G major, Eine kleine Nachtmusik, which is the theme tune to Sideshow Bob's show. The close up shot of Krusty's face behind bars in the beginning of act two is a reference of the closing credit motif of the British television series The Prisoner from the 1960s. The background music in that scene resembles the theme of the television series Mission: Impossible at one point. Sideshow Bob is reading The Man in the Iron Mask by Alexander Dumas to the studio audience. The song "Ev'ry Time We Say Goodbye" by Cole Porter is featured in the episode. Following Sideshow Bob's arrest, he mutters to the Simpsons children, "And I would've gotten away with it too, if it weren't for these meddling kids.", which is a reference to a catchphrase from Hanna-Barbera's Scooby-Doo franchise, which was airing on ABC as A Pup Named Scooby-Doo when this episode aired.

Reception
In its original American broadcast, "Krusty Gets Busted" finished 13th in the ratings for the week of April 23–29, 1990, with a Nielsen rating of 16.4. It was the highest rated show on the Fox network that week. The episode received generally positive reviews from critics. Warren Martyn and Adrian Wood, the authors of the book I Can't Believe It's a Bigger and Better Updated Unofficial Simpsons Guide, praised the episode: "The invention of the Simpsons' arch enemy as a lugubrious yet psychotic Englishman in dreadlocks succeeds wonderfully in this super-fast, super-funny episode that works by constantly reversing the audience's expectations."

In a DVD review of the first season, David B. Grelck rated this episode a3 (of 5). Colin Jacobson at DVD Movie Guide said in a review that "throughout the episode we found great material; it really seemed clear that the show was starting to turn into the piece we now know and love. It's hard for me to relate any deficiencies" and added that "almost every Bob episode offers a lot of fun, and this episode started that trend in fine style." Screen Rant called it the best episode of the first season. Series creator Matt Groening listed it as his ninth favorite episode of The Simpsons and added "I have a peculiar love of TV clownery".

References

External links

 
 

The Simpsons (season 1) episodes
1990 American television episodes
Wrongful convictions in fiction

cs:Simpsonovi (první série)#Je Šáša vinen?